Sheykhlan-e Olya (also Romanized as Sheykhlān-e ‘Olyā; also known as Sheykhlān-e Bālā) is a village in Abish Ahmad Rural District, Abish Ahmad District, Kaleybar County, East Azerbaijan Province, Iran. At the 2006 census, its population was 149, in 40 families.

References 

Populated places in Kaleybar County